Joseph Paul Luc Alain Caron (April 27, 1938 - December 18, 1986) was a Canadian professional ice hockey player who played in various leagues from 1956 to 1976.

Career
Caron played 60 games in the National Hockey League for the Oakland Seals and Montreal Canadiens, followed by three seasons in the World Hockey Association (WHA) for the Quebec Nordiques and the Michigan Stags/Baltimore Blades.
 
Caron finished his career in the North American Hockey League, playing for the Beauce Jaros. Jaros finished the 1975-76 season with a career high 78 goals in only 73 games. Additionally, he scored a league-leading 21 goals and 36 points in the playoffs. Caron suffered a heart attack during the summer at age 38 and was forced to retire from professional hockey.

Personal life
After Caron retired from hockey, he took a position working for a brewery in Quebec. Caron died after he suffered a second heart attack on December 18, 1986. He was 48 years old.

Career statistics

Regular season and playoffs

References

External links

1938 births
1986 deaths
Baltimore Blades players
Beauce Jaros players
Buffalo Bisons (AHL) players
Canadian ice hockey centres
Charlotte Checkers (EHL) players
Chicoutimi Saguenéens (QSHL) players
Ice hockey people from Quebec
Michigan Stags players
Montreal Canadiens players
Montreal Voyageurs players
Oakland Seals players
People from Dolbeau-Mistassini
Quebec Aces (AHL) players
Quebec Nordiques (WHA) players
Sault Thunderbirds players